Hendra Mole (born 11 April 1995) is an Indonesian professional footballer who plays as a goalkeeper for Liga 2 club Bekasi City.

Club career

Sriwijaya
In 2019, Hendra Mole signed a one-year contract with Indonesian Liga 2 club Sriwijaya.

PSS Sleman
He was signed for PSS Sleman to play in Liga 1 in the 2020 season. This season was suspended on 27 March 2020 due to the COVID-19 pandemic. The season was abandoned and was declared void on 20 January 2021.

Return to Sriwijaya
In 2021, it was confirmed that Mole would re-join Sriwijaya, signing a year contract. He made his league debut on 30 November 2021 against PSMS Medan at the Kaharudin Nasution Rumbai Stadium, Pekanbaru.

References

External links
 Hendra Mole at Soccerway
 Hendra Mole at Liga Indonesia

1995 births
Living people
Indonesian footballers
Perseru Serui players
Badak Lampung F.C. players
Sriwijaya F.C. players
Liga 2 (Indonesia) players
Liga 1 (Indonesia) players
Sportspeople from North Maluku
Association football goalkeepers